Union Assurance PLC is an insurance company in Sri Lanka. Union Assurance was founded in 1987 and was listed on the Colombo Stock Exchange in the following year. In 2009, John Keells Holdings acquired a controlling stake in the company. The company divested its general insurance business to Fairfirst Insurance and focused on life insurance in 2015. The company was a constituent of Forbes Asia's Best Under a Billion list in 2018. Union Assurance is one of the LMD 100 companies in Sri Lanka. The company is also one of the 100 most valuable brands in Sri Lanka.

History
Union Assurance was founded in 1987 by Aitken Spence, Carson Cumberbatch, Mercantile Credit and Whittall Boustead. The company commenced operations and was listed on the Colombo Stock Exchange in the following year. Union Assurance entered the market when the Government of Sri Lanka ended the government monopoly of the insurance sector with the enactment of the Control of Insurance Act No. 42 of 1986. Sri Lankan conglomerate John Keells Holdings acquired 81% shares in Union Assurance in 2009 thus giving them control of the company.

Union Assurance divided its life and non-life businesses in 2015, and divested its stake in the non-life insurance business to Fairfirst Insurance. Union Assurance held 8.7% of insurance sector assets in 2016, making them the fourth biggest player behind Sri Lanka Insurance, Ceylinco Insurance and AIA Insurance. In 2018, Union Assurance was included in Forbes Asia's Best Under a Billion list. The company was the only Sri Lankan company on the list that year. The company introduced its new logo in 2020, which emphasises the company's repositioning in the life insurance sector.

Operations
Union Assurance is ranked 54th in LMD 100, an annual list of publicly traded companies in Sri Lanka ranked by revenue, in its 2020/21 edition. Union Assurance is placed 51st amongst the most valuable brands in Sri Lanka. The brand value grew by 10.5% in 2022 to LKR1,982 million according to Brand Finance. Union Assurance provides bancassurance in collaboration with several banks in Sri Lanka.

Market research conducted by the company revealed low levels of saving patterns among Sri Lankans. The study revealed that Sri Lankans fall behind recommended 10%-15% of gross salary savings. A quarter of the population had no savings while 37% saved between 1%-5% of their income. The company appointed Jude Gomes as the chief executive officer in 2019. At the time of his appointment Gomes was the chairman and CEO of Manulife China Bank Life Assurance Corporation in the Philippines. Union Assurance won an award at the 2022 Women Friendly Workplace Awards.

Finances

Source: Annual Report, 2021 (pp. 256–257)

See also
 List of companies listed on the Colombo Stock Exchange

References

External links
 Official website

1987 establishments in Sri Lanka
Financial services companies established in 1987
Companies listed on the Colombo Stock Exchange
Insurance companies of Sri Lanka